Xhevdet Llumnica (born 24 June 1979) is a Kosovo Albanian retired footballer, who played for Limhamn Bunkeflo.

Born in Pristina, SR Serbia, back then within Yugoslavia and now capital of Kosovo, Llumnica is a striker that played for several clubs in Kosovo and Sweden.

International career
He also played one game for the Kosovo national team in 2002.

References

Notes
 

1979 births
Living people
Sportspeople from Pristina
Kosovan footballers
Kosovo pre-2014 international footballers
Association football forwards
FC Drita players
FC Prishtina players
Kalmar FF players
Husqvarna FF players
Assyriska FF players
IF Limhamn Bunkeflo (men) players
Kosovan expatriate footballers
Kosovan expatriate sportspeople in Sweden
Expatriate footballers in Sweden